The Black Dragon Society is a non fictional Japanese secret society, also known as the Kokuryūkai, which appears in DC Comics. The publisher first used the name in 1942's All Star Comics issue #12 (August 1942) as Japanese saboteurs. They were created by Gardner Fox and Jack Burnley. The same name and concept was also used by several other 1940s comics publishers that were later bought out by DC. A modern reimagining of the group as ecoterrorists was presented in JLA.

Publication history
The Black Dragon Society is based on a real World War II organization of the same name. As such, three separate comics companies (National Comics, Fawcett Comics, and Quality Comics) used them as villains. 

The Fawcett Comics version debuted in Master Comics #21 (December 1941), it had Minute-Man fighting against the Society, and was created by Bill Woolfolk and Charles Sultan. The DC Comics version debuted in All Star Comics #12 (August 1942) and was created by Gardner Fox and Jack Burnley, in the story "The Black Dragon Menace" in which a Japanese spy ring called the Black Dragon Society of Japan steals eight American inventions and kidnaps their inventors. Quality Comics' version debuted in Military Comics #24 (November 1943), and was created by Ted Udall and Vernon Henkel.

Fictional team history
The Justice Battalion are given orders to retrieve eight stolen military weapons, and subdue the agents of the Black Dragon Society who had orchestrated the thefts. Starman took on a huge dirigible which acted as a flying aircraft carrier and the planes it housed. The Society, loyal to Imperial Japan, was to use the planes to attack an American city but Starman prevented this. Because of Johnny Thunder's bumbling, the whole Battalion was transported to the American HQ of the Black Dragon Society. After a quick fight and a call to the US Army, the threat posed by the Black Dragons was over.

The Black Dragon Society as an anti-U.S. organization also fought Minute-Man, Atom, Black Condor, the Sniper, and Johnny Everyman during World War II.

The Dragon King was a Japanese national and scientific genius who struck off from the Society early on. It was the Dragon King, using a combination of the occult and super-science, who created the forcefield that protected the Axis countries from the superhuman operatives of the Allies. He somehow was able to combine the energies of the Spear of Destiny with those of the Holy Grail to accomplish this. At some point after the war he develops an immortality serum that transforms him into a reptilian humanoid.

The modern versions of the Black Dragon Society show up in the pages of an issue of JLA. This version appears to be made up of fanatical, east Asian eco-terrorists with the stated intention of putting an end to the exploitation of Pacific oil fields by the west. They take the executive board of the Petroil oil company hostage, and kill all of their security and support staff. A superteam known as the Power Company shows up and shuts down the Black Dragons before they can kill their hostages. At the end of the story, it is revealed that the entire incident was only part of making a TV commercial for the Power Company, with the Black Dragon members being dressed-up actors on a set. Whether the commercial was based on a real incident, and if the Power Company ever battled the real Black Dragons, is not known.

References

External links
 DCU Guide Black Dragon Society
 Power Company Indedx Fanzing #47

DC Comics supervillain teams
Fictional eco-terrorists